The Coquette (German: Die Erzkokette) is a 1917 German silent comedy film directed by Franz Eckstein and Rosa Porten and starring Porten, Reinhold Schünzel, and Eduard von Winterstein. It premiered at the Marmorhaus in Berlin.

Cast
 Reinhold Schünzel as Tertianer Rolf 
 Rosa Porten
 Gustav von Wangenheim
 Eduard von Winterstein

References

Bibliography
 Bock, Hans-Michael & Bergfelder, Tim. The Concise CineGraph. Encyclopedia of German Cinema. Berghahn Books, 2009.

External links

1917 films
Films of the German Empire
German silent feature films
Films directed by Franz Eckstein
Films directed by Rosa Porten
German black-and-white films
1917 comedy films
German comedy films
Silent comedy films
1910s German films